Joann Lõssov (10 September 1921 – 3 August 2000), also known as Ioann Fyodorovich Lysov (Иоанн Фёдорович Лысов), was an Estonian basketball player. Lõssov trained at VSS Kalev, in Tallinn. He was named MVP of the 1947 EuroBasket. Member of the Soviet Union basketball team in 1947–52, from 1949, the captain and points guard. After his career as a player, worked as the head coach of the Soviet Union women’s team in 1953–58 (gold medals from the European Championships of 1954 and 1956) and helped to organise special trainings of the Soviet Union team. Elected to the Hall of fame of Estonian basketball in 2010.

Soviet national team
Lõssov played with the senior Soviet Union national basketball team at the 1952 Summer Olympics, where he won a silver medal. He played in all eight of the Soviet Union's games.

Club career 
Lõssov's career started  in 1936. He played for the teams of the YMCA and Russ before the war. After the war he played in Tallinna Kalev. With the team of the University of Tartu he won a gold medal (1949) and a silver medal (1950) of Soviet Union League Championship.

Achievements

National Team 
 Olympic Games:   1952
 European Championships:  1947,  1951

Club 
 Soviet Union League Championship: 1949
 Estonian SSR Championship: 1944-1947, 1955

Orders
 Order of the White Star, 5th Class: 1998

References

Further reading 
 
 Tiit Lääne, Eesti olümpiamedalivõitjad 1912–2006. Tallinn 2006 (ISBN 9949-427-25-8)
 Joann Lõssov, Paavo Kivine, Elu on mäng. Tallinn 1998 (ISBN 998581827X)

External links
 
 
 
 

1921 births
2000 deaths
Estonian men's basketball players
Soviet men's basketball players
Olympic basketball players of the Soviet Union
Basketball players at the 1952 Summer Olympics
Olympic silver medalists for the Soviet Union
Basketball players from Tallinn
FIBA EuroBasket-winning players
Olympic medalists in basketball
Estonian basketball coaches
Tartu Ülikool/Rock players
Medalists at the 1952 Summer Olympics
Estonian people of Russian descent
Recipients of the Order of the White Star, 5th Class
Honoured Masters of Sport of the USSR

KK Kalev players